The 1928 Maryland Aggies football team was an American football team that represented the University of Maryland in the Southern Conference during the 1928 college football season. In their 18th season under head coach Curley Byrd, the Aggies compiled a 6–3–1 record (2–3–1 in conference), finished 14th in the Southern Conference, and outscored their opponents by a total of 132 to 70.

Schedule

References

Maryland
Maryland Terrapins football seasons
Maryland Aggies football